The Vulture (Adrian Toomes) is a supervillain appearing in American comic books published by Marvel Comics. Toomes is an inventive, but maniacal genius who designed a special suit that allows him to fly at vast speeds. After turning to a life of crime, he became a recurring enemy of the superhero Spider-Man, and a founding member of the Sinister Six. Other characters have also taken the mantle.

Since his conception, the character has been adapted from into various other forms of Spider-Man media, including television series and video games. In live-action, the character was played by Michael Keaton in the Marvel Cinematic Universe film Spider-Man: Homecoming (2017) and the Sony's Spider-Man Universe film Morbius (2022).

Publication history
The original Vulture, Adrian Toomes, first appeared in The Amazing Spider-Man #2 (May 1963), and was created by Stan Lee and Steve Ditko. According to Ditko, Lee wanted the villain to be heavy-set and based on actor Sydney Greenstreet. Ditko designed him to be leaner and more gaunt, feeling he should be swift and fast and also because "The bulkier anything is, the more panel space it has to take up, thereby shrinking panel space for other characters and story panel elements."

Since Toomes originally assumed the Vulture alias, several other character have taken on the mantle. The second incarnation, Blackie Drago, first appeared in The Amazing Spider-Man #48 (May 1967), and was created by Stan Lee and John Romita Sr. Lee created the new version because he thought that Spider-Man looked like a bully fighting a wizened old man. However, the readers wrote in that they did not like the new Vulture, and Lee relented and brought the original back.

The third incarnation, Clifton Shallot, first appeared in The Amazing Spider-Man #127, and was created by Ross Andru, Gerry Conway, and John Romita Sr.

A fourth incarnation, Jimmy Natale, first appears in The Amazing Spider-Man #593 as part of the story arc "Spider-Man 24/7" and was created by Mark Waid and Mike McKone.

In Young Men #26, a scientist named Isidoro Scarlotti, created by Joe Gill and Carl Burgos, went by the Vulture name and was an enemy of the original Human Torch and Toro.

Fictional character biography
Adrian Toomes was born in Staten Island, New York. He is a former electronic engineer who was once Gregory Bestman's business partner; Bestman handled the finances whilst Toomes handled the inventions. One day, after creating a flight harness, Toomes eagerly rushed into Bestman's office to share the happy news, but he was not there. Toomes discovered that Bestman had secretly been embezzling funds and then, Toomes got no legal recourse, meaning he lost his job. Enraged, Toomes wrecked the business, discovering that exposure to the harness had also granted him superhuman strength. He then decided to turn to crime professionally as the Vulture.

The Vulture employs a special electromagnetic harness of his own design that allows him to fly; his flight is directed by a pair of artificial wings worn on his arms. The harness also endows him with enhanced strength and (according to some sources) increases his lifespan. Although Toomes is advanced in age, he is a strong fighter and a remorseless killer. On one occasion, he restored his youth through biochemical means, though this wore off after exposure to an elemental superhuman's corpse. At one point, he had used a device to steal Spider-Man's youth, leaving Vulture young and Spider-Man elderly, but this effect wore off within hours.

Vulture was on a robbery and burglary spree throughout New York City when he first encountered Spider-Man. Spider-Man realized for the first time he could sell photos to J. Jonah Jameson after the Daily Bugle offered a reward for a picture of Vulture. Due to a preoccupation with the camera, Spider-Man was knocked out by Vulture and sealed in a water tank with sides too slippery to climb up, but was able to break free. Vulture then challenged the police, saying he was going to steal diamonds; however, he escaped through the sewers. Spider-Man had created a device that stopped Vulture's harness from working and activated it during an airborne fight with Vulture, causing the two to crash onto a roof, knocking Vulture unconscious. He was then arrested. Vulture modified his harness, and attempted to rob the Daily Bugle payroll. He joined Doctor Octopus's first Sinister Six, and gave the message to the Daily Bugle that the group had captured Betty Brant. He was the last foe to battle Spider-Man before Doctor Octopus. He forced Spider-Man to remove the web-shooters by threatening to fly away, then squirted oil onto the roof, and tried to push Spider-Man off using a wind created by his wings, but Spider-Man escaped this. Vulture was caught after Spider-Man swung onto him using a lasso. He then told Spider-Man where to find Doctor Octopus's lair and (like the rest of the team) was jailed at the end of the story.

Later, believing himself to be dying in prison due to injuries obtained in the prison workshop, Toomes revealed an extra Vulture outfit's location on the prison grounds to his cellmate Blackie Drago. Drago revealed to Toomes he caused the accident for this very purpose. Toomes was angry, but apparently fell unconscious within the next few minutes; Blackie then knocked out a guard, dug up the wings, and escaped. Drago, as Vulture, teamed with Kraven the Hunter against Spider-Man. Toomes ultimately escaped from prison and recovered from his injuries – crediting his hatred for Drago's betrayal with the strength to overcome them – and as the Vulture again, defeating Drago. Toomes then nearly defeated Spider-Man in battle, injuring the arm before Spider-Man managed to play possum and tricked Toomes into coming in close enough for Spider-Man to damage his power pack and force his nemesis to retreat. Some time later, Dr. Clifton Shallot mutated his body into a form resembling Toomes's, but possessing natural wings and flight capability.

The Vulture later humiliated the racketeering mobster Mr. Morgan, who hired the Hitman to kill Spider-Man, trying to rob the Vulture of revenge. Vulture then arranged New York's top mobsters' murders in order to be New York's new crime lord, and battled Spider-Man again. Vulture later escaped prison, and battled Spider-Man again.

Vulture came out of retirement to claim vengeance on his former research partner Bestman who embezzled him out of the profits of their business. He then confronted the Vulturions, a group of criminal youths who stole his designs.

He became involved in Atlantic City casino racketeering to prepare for his own ostentatious funeral, but was thwarted by the Hobgoblin. Reduced to a "mere salesman", he journeyed to Las Vegas, where he attacked Morris "Snake" Diamond in the middle of the desert for stealing Toomes's blueprint journals for ultrasonic-sensitive dice. Intending to inject Snake with a mummification serum, Vulture was thwarted by Spider-Man (who had been granted a flight on Snake's plane back to New York) and Agent Sara Glenville of the Central Intelligence Division. He later confronted the mutants Rusty Collins and Skids in an attempt to release Nitro.

On more than one occasion, Toomes has been in league with several of Spider-Man's other villains in order to destroy the wall-crawler. Vulture has been in every incarnation of Sinister Six, and also appeared in the ranks of the Sinister Twelve. He has a strong friendship with fellow villain Electro; the two once nearly beat Spider-Man to death.

During one of his many periods of ill health, Toomes struck up a friendship with Nathan Lubensky, a man who had become the new love of May Parker's life. Nathan was unaware of Toomes's true identity, and encouraged the injured criminal to take chances with life and not to let handicaps drag him down (Nathan was a paraplegic). Toomes followed Nathan's advice and went on a crime spree as the Vulture while hiding out in his civilian identity at the same nursing home Nathan lived in, reasoning that the authorities would never think to look for him there. After Peter Parker visited the nursing home and recognized him, however, a battle ensued between the Vulture and Spider-Man. During the course of the fight, Toomes instinctively grabbed a hostage and threatened to kill him if Spider-Man did not back down; however, as soon as Toomes realized that the hostage was Nathan, he decided he could not take the life of a man who had helped to save his own. He shoved Nathan's wheelchair at Spider-Man, distracting the web-slinger long enough for Toomes to make his getaway.

Vulture would seemingly cherish Nathan's influence, but irony would serve him a cruel blow when he was hired by the Kingpin to assassinate a high-ranking casino runner. During another conflict with Spider-Man just prior to joining Doctor Octopus's new Sinister Six, the Vulture sought to use a hostage as a shield, and selected May Parker from the crowd. Nathan, who was with May, leapt from his wheelchair and grabbed Toomes. Not realizing who it was, Toomes flew high into the air with Nathan on his back. The shock of seeing how high they were caused Nathan to suffer a fatal heart attack. Toomes fled as Nathan was falling. Though he was successfully caught by Spider-Man, Nathan would die in May's arms.

Toomes was later diagnosed with cancer, caused by frequent exposure to the essential chemicals needed to power his flying apparatus. In an attempt to be forgiven for all of his previous sins, Vulture terrorized the Parker household, pleading that May Parker forgive him for indirectly causing Nathan's death. The enraged Parker attacked Toomes, forcing the Vulture to capture him and take him back to his old lair. After escaping Toomes, Peter switched to Spider-Man and brutally assaulted the Vulture, and in the ensuing battle, Vulture's own power pack malfunctioned and exploded, setting his wings ablaze. Spider-Man successfully ripped the burning pack off of Toomes, and the two crash landed in a muddy ditch.

After being arrested, Toomes was returned to the Parker home so May, reunited with Peter, could identify him. May hoped that Toomes' death would be slow and full of suffering. The next day, she visited Toomes in prison and apologized to him for her cruel remarks, but also stated that she could not forgive him, and that any kind of redemption would be left up to him and God.

Vulture stumbled across a plot by the Chameleon and the Green Goblin (Harry Osborn) to drive Spider-Man insane by having shapeshifting androids impersonate his late mother and father; due to Toomes' interference, the androids were destroyed, leading the wall-crawler to a brief nervous breakdown. The Vulture absorbed the artificial life force from the Mary Parker android, and the effect on the Vulture was twofold; not only did he become a young man again, but he was instantly cured of his cancer. During this period, he attempted to kill everyone who had ever known him as an old man in an attempt to get a clean slate for his life, but this plan went wrong when he targeted a Prowler impersonator as the Prowler having once thwarted his attempted takeover of his old company; Toomes was unconcerned about the fact that the current Prowler was a thief who had stolen the costume of the original Prowler (Hobie Brown) and Spider-Man; although Toomes nearly gutted the fake Prowler, Spider-Man managed to get him to the hospital. During a later fight with Spider-Man, the Vulture was 'attacked' by David Kalen, a man capable of dissolving anything he touched who had turned his power on himself in his grief at the death of his brother. Toomes subsequently reverted to his old age, presumably due to Kalen's power having negated the youth effect. His cancer, however, did not return.

In the Identity Disc series, it was revealed that Toomes, with the help of Sandman, manipulated Marvel villains Bullseye, Deadpool, Juggernaut and Sabretooth into laying siege to terrorist group A.I.M. headquarters in order to retrieve a disc containing the identities of undercover S.H.I.E.L.D. operatives, including his daughter with wife Cheryl, Valeria Toomes a.k.a. "Valerie Jessup".

During a brief time working for the Owl, he failed in a mission (and had his face brutally slashed by the Black Cat) and was severely beaten as punishment. He subsequently revealed himself as a member of Norman Osborn's Sinister Twelve — though he wore a helmet, presumably to mask the wounds.

Under the tutelage of Alyosha Kravinoff, Toomes briefly attempted a stint at heroism, but before long he returned to the other side of the law.

Aside from his daughter, Toomes also has a son whom he has dismissed, and a grandson from that son. The Vulture has come to care deeply for both his grandson and his mother, committing a series of robberies to finance a cure for his grandson's terminal illness. He once had a nephew, Malachai Toomes, and flew into a killing rage when he was murdered by a gang-lord.

During the Civil War, he was apprehended along with the Grim Reaper and the Trapster, by Captain America and the growing Resistance, who chained him together with Grim Reaper to a pole and broke his nose. When he was found and taken into custody by S.H.I.E.L.D., he complained, "that lunatic broke my damn nose." After Spider-Man unmasked himself, Toomes was seen in his jail cell, knitting his fingers together. As someone on the television set said they hoped it would not be any trouble for Spider-Man, Toomes said, "Oh, I think it will be."

After Spider-Man goes rogue, Toomes is seen in a S.H.I.E.L.D. prison cell speaking with Agent Jamie Madrox, and commenting on Spider-Man's inherent weakness, that being his unwillingness to use his powers for personal gain. S.H.I.E.L.D. then returns his flying harness and encourages him to hunt down Spider-Man, saying that he "is now an outlaw, same as you."

Later, the Vulture attacks Spider-Man at a book signing, and manages to slash him with a powerful sedative. Toomes, however, falls unconscious and, sensing something is wrong, Spider-Man rushes him to the hospital.

Toomes wakes up a few hours later, where a doctor reveals that he has suffered a stroke, and many of his muscles on the left side of his body have been paralyzed. When the doctor leaves, Spider-Man sneaks in and Toomes asks him to kill him because he is weak. When Spider-Man refuses to do so, he says that Spider-Man is also weak, and always has been. After making remarks about Uncle Ben, Spider-Man takes a pillow and begins suffocating him. He fights back, and Spider-Man removes the pillow, commenting that "For somebody who's begging to die, you fight for life pretty hard."

When Alyosha Kravinoff began collecting a zoo of animal-themed superhumans, Vulture was one of his captives. To stop Vulture from using his intellect to find a way to remove his bomb collar, Kraven broke his hands repeatedly, but with the help of Rhino, Vulture escapes.

Spider-Man later visits Vulture's cell to ask him about the latest person who calls himself the Vulture. Toomes says calmly that he has no connection to him, though he heard that the new Vulture was made that way by the mob and is out for revenge. He just as blandly states that while he normally hates people who steal the Vulture name, he would have no problem with him killing Spider-Man.

Following the "Spider-Island"' storyline, Vulture returns as the leader of an unnamed gang of penthouse thieves and murderers who have vulture-like wings, but with a new gothic style. The members of his gang have the same name of an angel that matches with the black angel look they have. However, it is swiftly revealed that the gang's technology is actually controlled by the Vulture who designed their wings so that he could shut them down with a simple signal if they tried to act against him. Having used his new magnetically sensitive webbing to catch the gang and deactivate their wings, Spider-Man defeats Toomes despite his new use of his gravity-manipulating technology to give himself seemingly superhuman strength.

Carlie Cooper later works with the Superior Spider-Man (Otto Octavius's mind in Spider-Man's body) to investigate a series of crimes committed by the Vulture's gang. Superior Spider-Man confronts Vulture and attempts to bribe him into giving up crime by offering him a small fortune from Octavius's hidden bank accounts. Vulture does not believe a word of it, and has his midget henchmen attack. Superior Spider-Man accidentally knocks out one of the midget henchmen who turns out to be a young boy. Realizing that Vulture has been using children all this time and remembering his own abusive childhood, Superior Spider-Man attacks Vulture in a rage. After a brief midair struggle, Superior Spider-Man blinds Vulture with a searchlight, causing him to crash onto the roof. Carlie arrives and finds Vulture, broken and bloody, but still alive. Vulture's child henchmen are then recruited by the Goblin King to be part of the Goblin Nation. Vulture is later seen in the Raft's infirmary, along with Boomerang and Scorpion. When Alistair Alphonso Smythe escapes with the mini-Spider-Slayers' help, the mini-Spider-Slayers are sent into the infirmary to heal and enhance Vulture, Boomerang, and Scorpion in exchange for their assistance in killing Superior Spider-Man. While Superior Spider-Man fights Boomerang, Vulture is sent to attack the civilians in the Raft. Glory Grant, Norah Winters, and Smythe's lawyer plead with him to stop, claiming they can clear him of any charges, causing him to stop and consider his options. When Smythe dies, the Vulture's enhancements fail, leaving him blind once again. He is then tasered by Ted Shipley, the Raft's Chief of Security. Vulture eventually has another encounter with Superior Spider-Man, seeking revenge for his recent defeats, but is defeated again. Vulture, Chameleon, Electro, Sandman, and Mysterion are later seen as part of a team led by Superior Spider-Man called the "Superior Six", which is forced via mind control to perform heroic (and occasionally dangerous) deeds as an act of "redemption". When they are not being controlled, they are kept in containment cells. They eventually break free of Superior Spider-Man's control and attempt to exact revenge on the wall-crawler, nearly destroying New York in the process. Superior Spider-Man barely manages to stop them with Sun Girl's help.

Adrian Toomes later developed a modified version of his electromagnetic harness that has a reinforced helmet and lightweight, razor-sharp, nano-woven wings which responded to his mental commands, where he took on the Falcon name, which he believed to be vacant at the time. He robbed a location in East Village where he fought Spider-Man, until they were immobilized by a new Trapster who made off with Falcon's loot.

During the "Hunt for Wolverine" storyline, Spider-Man was seen thwarting Vulture's robbery when he is called in by Iron Man to help him, Luke Cage, and Jessica Jones find Wolverine's body when it goes missing from his unmarked grave.

In a prelude to the "Hunted" storyline, Vulture is among the animal-themed characters captured by Taskmaster and Black Ant on Kraven the Hunter's behalf. He is among those who Arcade publicly reveals as the Savage Six.

Vulture's son Frankie Toomes is married to a woman named Lenora. When Frankie left Lenora, Toomes often visited Lenora and her daughter Tiana to support them. At one point, Vulture took Tiana on a ride in his Vulture suit. After Lenora died from a surgical error, Adrian started to take care of Tiana. As Tiana came to age, Adrian made a suit similar to his so that Tiana can follow whatever destiny awaits. This led to Tiana being Starling.

At the time when Vulture visited Tiana, he gave her a set of pencils. When Spider-Man is sighted outside, Tiana slips off to become Starling to make sure that Spider-Man stayed away from her grandfather. During the fight, Spider-Man mentioned to Starling that her grandfather has killed people like Nathan Lubensky and Gibbon. When Spider-Man collapses upon being hit by the elephant tranquilizers she used on him, Starling realizes that she might be lying to herself about Vulture.

Powers, abilities, and equipment
By utilizing his Vulture harness, Adrian Toomes is able to fly as if with a natural winged flight. He wears a costume of synthetic stretch fabric housing an electromagnetic harness with artificial bird-like wings attached beneath the arms. This consists of an anti-graviton generator worn on his body as a harness, enabling him to hover silently with precise maneuverability. The Vulture harness increases his resistance to injury in which that he can survive blows from Spider-Man's super strength. Another by-product of his exposure to its unique radiation as that, despite old age and no exercise, Toomes' physical strength represents the upper limits in human development. When he removes it, most of these abilities would slowly fade, although the rate at which this transpires remains unclear (some writers have suggested that his strength is permanent). Toomes is also elderly and depends on the tailored suit for strength, speed, and health boosting, as well as draining life-forces to maintain his own youth. It has recently been revealed that, due to the prolonged use of his harness, he could levitate or float even without it, but Vulture still need those wings for mobility while airborne. He once upgraded a new version of his flying apparatus, complete with battle armor, metallic wings, and sharpened feathers. During the later years, he added various weapons to his arsenal. Vulture possesses brilliant expertise in the fields of electronics and chemistry, with a great talent for invention.

Other characters named Vulture

Blackie Drago

Raniero "Blackie" Drago was a prison cellmate of Adrian Toomes's. He tricked Toomes by causing an accident in the prison workshop that made Toomes think he could die soon, and stole the Vulture harness and costume which was recently rebuilt. He used the suit to make money through air piracy which led to a confrontation with Spider-Man, that Drago believed ended in the wall-crawler's death (Spider-Man had merely collapsed due to a serious cold in reality). After robbing a helicopter, Drago was pursued by Kraven the Hunter, who resented his claims of victory over Spider-Man, and ended up fighting him until Spider-Man arrived. Spider-Man managed to defeat them both and webbed them up for the police.

Drago was later 'rescued' from prison by Toomes - who revealed that the revelation of Drago's role in his accident had given him the strength to overcome his injuries - but that was merely so that Toomes could prove himself to be the true Vulture once again. Once the two were free, he was subsequently defeated and humiliated by Toomes, who regained the recognition he deserved. A humbled Drago was taken away by the police, vowing "I'm through!! I'll never put these wings on again! The Vulture's too much...for anyone!"

Drago was later seen in the same prison that Norman Osborn was incarcerated in during the "Sinister Twelve" storyline.

Clifton Shallot

Doctor Clifton Shallot was an expert on bio-mutation and a professor at Empire State University. He also had one of Toomes' harnesses and costumes, which he had requisitioned from the State Prison Authority. When one of his courses was cancelled by the university trustees, he snapped, and underwent the final stage of the mutation himself when he donned the Vulture costume – his face, teeth, and fingernails mutated, and for a short time, the wings became part of his body and he could fly. The only ones who knew his secret was his lab assistant Dr. Christine Murrow and her roommate Gloria Jenkins.

Mary Jane Watson witnessed him killing Gloria (whom he had mistaken for Christine) and she became a target. While flying around Mary Jane's apartment, he noticed Spider-Man and attacked him. Vulture managed to defeat Spider-Man and leave him for dead. Shallot then searched for a way to reverse the transformation. He stole some chemicals from a ship called the Düsseldorf at Dock 20. The next morning as he was flying to Christine's lab, Vulture noticed Mary Jane in her car. He dove toward the car and grabbed Mary Jane. He was then encountered in the air by Spider-Man, who dropped Mary Jane, giving Vulture enough time to reach the Biology Lab. He attacked Christine, only for Spider-Man to arrive and defend her. Vulture managed to rip the webbing with his sharp finger claws and teeth. Their fight continued, with Spider-Man blinding Vulture with the webbing as the cops arrived and threw a net over them. Still blinded by the webbing, Vulture broke free from the net and grabbed Spider-Man, thinking he was Christine. When he saw it was Spider-Man, Vulture ended up dropping him.

Vulture went back to his lab and transformed back into Shallot. He then had an agreement with Christine, stating that he would not kill her if she did not betray his trust. Later that night, Vulture flew back to Dock 20 and stole more chemicals. He noticed that Peter Parker had followed him and picked him up and dropped him into the water. When he flew above Mary Jane's apartment, Vulture noticed her getting into a taxi. Vulture attacked the taxi and kidnapped Mary Jane, only for Spider-Man to interrupt him, causing Vulture to flee. He made it back to his lab where Christine was. Spider-Man then arrived an hour later, finding Christine there. Vulture then attacked Spider-Man, who subdued him and force-fed Vulture the antidote he had stolen from the Düsseldorf. After reverting from his Vulture form, Shallot fainted. Shallot is presumably still serving his sentence for the murder of Gloria.

Vulturions

While in prison for dealing heroin, an engineer named Honcho is the cellmate of Adrian Toomes, who showed his Vulture harness designs to him. Memorizing on how to construct it, Honcho (when released on parole) builds four Vulture costumes (red, yellow, and silver) complete with anti-graviton generators in which he equips himself and three petty criminals (Gripes, Pidgeon, and Sugar Face). Gaining all the Vulture's powers, the group members called themselves the Vulturions. Wanting to become big-time criminals, the Vulturions make several tries to kill Spider-Man and accumulate wealth, ultimately failing in all their attempts. Learning of the Vulturions' existence, Toomes built himself a new Vulture suit and broke out of prison, intent on hunting down his "rip-offs". By locating the group, Adrian beats and nearly murders all of them, only to be stopped by Spider-Man. After defeating the Vulture, he turned him and the Vulturions in to the police.

A new group of Vulturions (consisting of three members, including a female) appear in Avengers: The Initiative, where they steal a briefcase containing classified research on gamma radiation from Baron Von Blitzschlag. One of the Vulturions is identified as Honcho (apparently released from prison and having gone back to crime). They are stopped with ease by a costume-less Peter Parker and the Scarlet Spiders.

During the "Civil War II" storyline, the original Vulturions resurface. This time, they have upgraded their gear and are still using the same moniker. The Vulturions were seen committing a heist until they were stopped by Spider-Man upon him being tipped off by Ulysses Cain.

During the "Spider-Geddon" storyline, the Vulturions are on a heist, where they encounter Miles Morales. Despite some difficulty, Miles defeats them.

Jimmy Natale

A fourth Vulture appears in the story arc "Spider-Man 24/7". He is a human/bird hybrid vigilante rather than supervillain, mercilessly killing and eating criminals. While fighting, he temporarily blinded Spider-Man by an acid the creature spits in his face. Spider-Man defeated a newer Vulture in the Yankee Stadium.

During The Gauntlet storyline, he escaped from prison and goes after the mobsters responsible for his transformation. The first mobster he finds revealed Vulture's past as the Maggia's "cleaner" Jimmy Natale and then, lies about the transformation caused by J. Jonah Jameson. In truth, it is actually Dr. Charles Goss, a biochemist who used these machines that were previously owned by the Stillwell brothers so they can have a new Vulture. Dr. Goss fibs that Jameson had a hand in his creation, until he confessed to the proper authorities. When Spider-Man fended him off, Vulture visits the mobster again, who came clean for being behind his mutation. After that, he killed him. Vulture was later seen soaring above the Daily Bugle ruins and flew past by a jobless Peter Parker at night.

In the Origin of the Species story-arc, the Vulture joins Doctor Octopus' supervillain team, which was assembled to procure specific items. He attacks Spider-Man, who is caring for Lily Hollister's newborn child in Hamilton Heights, but their fight was interrupted by the Freak. The two villains team-up after a brief scrimmage and are knocked out by Spider-Man.

A further-mutated Vulture is hired by the Exchange to assassinate the Punisher. Vulture ambushes the vigilante at an abandoned warehouse, and the two engage in an aerial battle, which ends with the Punisher fatally stabbing the Vulture in the torso and jaw, causing him to crash land in the South Bronx. The Punisher fled the scene, leaving Vulture's body to be recovered by the NYPD, and examined by Carlie Cooper.

Powers, abilities, and equipment
While wearing the Vulture costume, Drago has super strength, durability, and speed, as well as flight. He added a built-in radio helmet with limited receiver functions as extra protection for his head.

As a physical duplicate of the Vulture, Shallot has enhanced strength, resilience, and mobility, along with natural fangs and talons. He is capable of flight, due to the wings grafted onto his body. 

Each of the Vulturions wore costumes similar to Toomes' electromagnetic wing harness that granted them heightened physical attributes and flight. They can use blow darts to totally paralyze their opponents or a corrosive for melting glass in seconds.

The Red Vulture possesses inhuman strength and durability, as well as flight, natural talons, and acid expulsion. His costume is identical to Toomes, complete with bladed feathers.

Reception
 In 2020, CBR.com ranked Vulture 3rd in their "10 Most Powerful Members of the Sinister Syndicate" list.

Alternative versions

Amazing Spider-Man: Renew Your Vows
During the "Secret Wars" storyline in the pages of Amazing Spider-Man: Renew Your Vows, Vulture appears as a member of Regent's Sinister Six. His costume now has a beak-like mouth cover. In the Sinister Six's fight with Spider-Man at Public School 122 Mamie Fay, Vulture was incapacitated by Spider-Man.

During the "Spider-Geddon" storyline, there is a gang that is named after him called the Vulture Gang that is led by Kid Vulture. They are defeated by Spider-Man, Spinneret, and Spiderling and left for the police. Spider-Girl and Spider-Woman of Earth-925 run into Kid Vulture and the Vulture Gang and receive assistance in fighting them by Spider-Man, Spinneret, and Spiderling.

Earth-138
On Earth-138, Adrian Toomes is the CEO of Bestman/Toomes where the company had the subsidiary Toomestone Records. Using Toomestone Records, Adrian Toomes bought Free Medianet in an attempt to shut down Spider-Punk and his Spider-Slayers at the time when they were giving a free concert sponsored by Free Medianet. This interruption led to a fight between Toomes' security force and Spider-Punk's Spider-Army until it was interrupted by the arrival of the forces led by Ducktor Doom 2099 of Earth-8311.

Earth X
In the Earth X reality, Adrian Toomes has mutated into a more vulture-like appearance, with real wings, claws, and beak, due to the action of the Terrigen Mists. He was seen as a member of the Enforcers, bodyguards of the USA President Norman Osborn.

House of M
In the House of M reality, Vulture is one of Rhino's friends who helped him attack and detain the Green Goblin for ruining the best chance at a good life Rhino ever had. Here he is a human who is nearly attacked by a Sentinel for flying after Spider-Man with his winged suit.

Marvel 1602
In the Marvel 1602 reality, the group of warriors working for Otto von Doom are referred to as the Vulture-Fliers and wear flight-enabling armor similar to the mainstream universe Vulture's costume.

Marvel 2099

In Marvel 2099, a new Vulture is a recurring foe of that era's Spider-Man. This version of the character uses advanced combat armor to fly, and is an insane cannibal who wishes to rule the sky. In his debut, the Vulture saves Spider-Man from a group of thugs and proposes an alliance against the Public Eye Police Force with him, but Spider-Man rejects his offer of partnership when he realizes the Vulture is a man-eater. Spider-Man and the Vulture fight, their battle bringing them to a church, where the Vulture and his followers ("The Freakers") are driven off by Spider-Man's ally Kasey Nash and her gang the Throwbacks.

When the original Spider-Man is brought to the year 2099 due to two companies (one in 2099, the other in the past) experimenting with extra-dimensional generators, he fights and defeats the Vulture before meeting his successor, Spider-Man 2099.

When the floods have stopped, Vulture became the leader of the Wild Boyz and is revealed to have a daughter named Fiona. They were later killed by the Phalanx.

An unidentified reality's version of 2099 featured a version of Vulture who is a member of this reality's Sinister Six. His identity here is revealed to be Snidely.

Marvel Noir
The Marvel Noir version of Adrian Toomes (a.k.a. the Vulture) is depicted as a former circus freak, a geek who lived in a cage, feeding on chicken heads. The Vulture was taken by mob boss Norman Osborn (The Goblin) to become one of his hitmen. Toomes was responsible for the death of Ben Parker, whom the Vulture cannibalized after Parker was beaten by Osborn's Enforcers. Vulture later took May Parker hostage and attempted to kill her, but Spider-Man killed him instead.

Marvel Zombies
In the second issue of Marvel Zombies, an undead Adrian Toomes can be seen among a group of zombified heroes, whom he later aids in attacking the Silver Surfer. The zombified Vulture is among those who battled against the Silver Surfer and is seemingly killed. In "Marvel Zombies 3", it is revealed he survived, and along with the Angel, the Falcon, and Beak, he attacked the Earth-616 Machine Man, and Jocasta, but failed. Just as Machine Man killed the other three , Vulture, after almost being torn in half by a dangling Jocasta, attempted to retreat to his boss, but was blown up by Machine Man before he could successfully escape.

In the one-shot prequel issue to Marvel Zombies, Marvel Zombies: Dead Days, the Vulture is part of an undead version of the Sinister Six, alongside the Green Goblin, Doctor Octopus, Electro, and Mysterio, who he helps in attacking and devouring the inhabitants of New York.

MC2
In the timeline of MC2, Blackie Drago is revealed to have had a daughter named Brenda Drago, a.k.a. the Raptor.

Old Man Logan
In the pages of "Old Man Logan" that took place on Earth-21923, Vulture was among the villains that attacked the Avengers in Connecticut. Teaming up with Roderick Kingsley, Vulture targeted Wasp. After Hobgoblin was knocked off his glider and Wasp was shot in the chest, Giant-Man crushed Vulture in his hands.

Spider-Verse
During the Spider-Verse storyline, a group of five Vultures (consisting of alternate versions of Blackie Drago, Jimmy Natale, the Vulture Noir, a young Adrian Toomes, and Clifton Shallot) are members of the Hounds which are owned by Morlun's sister Verna. They are sent after the Ben Reilly of Earth-94 by Verna. Reilly defeats them with the aid of Spider-Ham and the Old Man Spider-Man of Earth-4. Toomes was eaten by the other Vultures, Shallot and Natale are implied to have been killed by Verna for their failure, and the rest are killed by Assassin Spider-Man, Superior Spider-Man, and Spider-Punk.

Another version of the Vulture from Earth-803 is a member of the "Six Men of Sinestry", the universe's version of the Sinister Six.

Spider-Gwen
The Vulture appears in the first arc in the Spider-Gwen solo series taking place on Earth-65, where Gwen Stacy was bitten by the radioactive spider. Vulture appears more deranged than his Earth-616 incarnation and secretes a green gaseous cloud wherever he goes. Vulture was attacking police officers while mentioning how Spider-Woman "killed" Peter Parker and was easily lured out by Gwen who wrote graffiti insults towards him all over the city. Once she caught his attention, both of them fought. As Vulture was flying away, Spider-Woman shot a webline in order to be carried away with him and follow him. However, Vulture used the claws in his suit to rip the web, causing Spider-Woman to fall from a great height. With Spider-Woman believed dead, Vulture was captured by Kingpin's henchmen and beaten up by Matt Murdock. Vulture admitted not being certain of Spider-Woman's death, due to the lack of a body. He was ordered by Matt Murdock to find evidence of her survival. Vulture attacked George Stacy in his home in order to find his connection with Spider-Woman, due to her rescuing him from Aleksei Sytsevich a long time ago, and gassed the residence. Gwen, who was on the scene, used the gas as a cover to change to her Spider-Woman suit and confront Vulture. After being shot in the shoulder by George Stacy, Vulture was forced to flee. Spider-Woman followed him, where she managed to beat him, even though she was under the effects of the gas. He was then left webbed to a police car.

Ultimate Marvel
The Ultimate Marvel incarnation of Adrian Toomes is an employee of Trask Industries who was about to extract the Venom symbiote from Eddie Brock, Jr. but the Beetle attacks the facility with knockout gas.

The Ultimate Marvel version of Vulture was rendered by artist Mark Bagley to resemble actor Jason Statham as per writer Brian Michael Bendis' instructions. This version is Blackie Drago, a disgruntled former S.H.I.E.L.D. agent who had been hired to kill Roxxon CEO Donald Roxxon. Drago received his equipment from the Tinkerer. He was defeated by Spider-Man and taken into S.H.I.E.L.D. custody, imprisoned in the Triskelion, headquarters of the Ultimates. When the Green Goblin broke out, several other villains (including Drago) escape in the chaos; a news report depicts Vulture's recapture at Captain America's hands.

He was apprehended by Spider-Woman and the Human Torch after a robbery.

Upon joining the Ultimate Six members Green Goblin, Doctor Octopus, Electro, Sandman, and Kraven the Hunter, Vulture plays a role in the "Death of Spider-Man" storyline. Osborn breaks him and the rest out of the Triskelion, and after their escape, informs them that God wishes for them to kill Spider-Man. Though Vulture witnesses Green Goblin kill Doctor Octopus when they argue about that. When Drago takes his teammates to Tinkerer's lair for weapons, Tinkerer still blamed him for bringing S.H.I.E.L.D. to his door as Green Goblin intimidates him to grant them some weapons to use. Vulture's suit is upgraded by Tinkerer as he states to Vulture that nobody else can fit it. When Electro is shot by Aunt May, an electric surge knocks out Kraven the Hunter, Sandman, and Vulture.

In other media

Television

 The Blackie Drago incarnation of Vulture, referred to as Vulture Man, appears in Spider-Man (1967), voiced by Gillie Fenwick. 
 The Adrian Toomes incarnation of Vulture appears in Spider-Man (1981), voiced by Don Messick.
 The Adrian Toomes incarnation of Vulture appears in Spider-Man: The Animated Series, voiced by Eddie Albert as an old man, and by Alan Johnson as a young man. Originally an engineer who sought revenge on Norman Osborn, this version undergoes a quest to drain youth from others in a bid to become younger. He later becomes a member of the Kingpin's Insidious Six.
 A heroic half-Bestial incarnation of Vulture from Counter-Earth appears in Spider-Man Unlimited, voiced by Scott McNeil.
 The Adrian Toomes incarnation of Vulture appears in The Spectacular Spider-Man, voiced by Robert Englund. This version wears a modified version of Terry Dodson's black and red costume from Marvel Knights Spider-Man. Originally an aeronautics engineer, Toomes initially seeks revenge against Norman Osborn for stealing his inventions before joining the Sinister Six as Doctor Octopus's right-hand man.
 The Adrian Toomes incarnation of Vulture appears in Ultimate Spider-Man (2012), voiced by Tom Kenny. This version is a teenage test subject of Doctor Octopus's genetic experiments with the ability to shapeshift between his human form and an anthropomorphic vulture-esque form that sports Jimmy Natale's organic wings and sonic shrieks. Toomes is later equipped with Blackie Drago's green Ultimate Marvel armor after becoming involved with Hydra and his mainstream version's red and black armor after joining the Sinister Six. Additionally, he is not as villainous as other versions and even regards Spider-Man as a friend, only siding with supervillains who offered to help him discover his origins before eventually redeeming himself.
 The Adrian Toomes incarnation of Vulture appears in Spider-Man (2017), voiced by Alastair Duncan. This version is a middle-aged man whose flight suit is equipped with a neck-mounted device that enables sonic attacks and initially serves as a henchman to Norman Osborn and a member of Doctor Octopus' Sinister Six. Toomes also inspires the Wake Riders and later goes on a personal quest for power as the Goblin King while leading the Goblin Nation.
 A Vulturion-esque group called the Wake Riders also appear in the series. Based on the name for a group of vultures, they are a viral stunt group that consists of their leader Barkley Blitz (voiced by Ogie Banks), an unnamed female (voiced by Audrey Wasilewski and by Melanie Minichino), and two unnamed males (both voiced by Zack Shada).
 The Adrian Toomes incarnation of Vulture appears in the Avengers Assemble episode "The Vibranium Curtain" Pt. 2, voiced again by Alastair Duncan.

Film
 Michael Keaton portrays Adrian Toomes in the Marvel Cinematic Universe (MCU) film Spider-Man: Homecoming. This version previously ran a New York salvaging company and is Liz Allan's father. Additionally, his flight suit is equipped with turbine-powered wings, claw-like wingtips, and boot-mounted talons. Years prior, with the creation of the Department of Damage Control following the Battle of New York, Toomes' company is run out of business. In response, he persuades his colleagues Phineas Mason, Herman Schultz, Jackson Brice, and Randy Vale not to relinquish the salvaged Chitauri technology they collected, and they go on to start a scavenging operation and black market weapons ring. After deducing Spider-Man's secret identity when the web-slinger interferes with his operation in the present, Toomes threatens retaliation unless Spider-Man stops, sparing his life since the latter previously saved Liz's life. However, Spider-Man thwarts Toomes' attempt to hijack a plane carrying much of the Avengers' weaponry and saves Toomes' life when his suit malfunctions before Happy Hogan and the FBI find and arrest Toomes. As a result, Toomes' family moves away. In a mid-credits scene, an imprisoned Toomes is approached by Mac Gargan, who wants to confirm whether the former knows Spider-Man's identity, which Toomes denies.
 Keaton reprises his role as Toomes in the post-credits scenes of the Sony's Spider-Man Universe (SSU) film Morbius. After being transported from the MCU to the SSU due to the events of Spider-Man: No Way Home, Toomes is released from prison due to not having committed any crimes in the latter universe. After developing a new Vulture suit, Toomes approaches Michael Morbius, suggesting they form a team.
 Vulture is set to appear in Spider-Man: Across the Spider-Verse, voiced by Jorma Taccone.

Video games
 The Adrian Toomes incarnation of Vulture appears in the Sega CD version of Spider-Man vs. The Kingpin.
 The Adrian Toomes incarnation of Vulture appears in Spider-Man: Return of the Sinister Six as a member of the Sinister Six.
 The Adrian Toomes incarnation of Vulture appears in Spider-Man (1995).
 The Adrian Toomes incarnation of Vulture appears in Spider-Man 2: The Sinister Six as a member of the Sinister Six.
 The Adrian Toomes incarnation of Vulture appears in Spider-Man (2002), voiced by Dwight Schultz.
 The Adrian Toomes incarnation of Vulture appears as a boss in the Nintendo DS and PSP versions of Spider-Man 2 (2004).
 The Ultimate Marvel incarnation of Adrian Toomes appears in the PlayStation 2, GameCube, and Xbox versions of Ultimate Spider-Man (2005), voiced by Brian George. This version works for Bolivar Trask. 
 The Adrian Toomes incarnation of Vulture appears as an assist character and boss in Spider-Man: Web of Shadows, voiced by Kristoffer Tabori. This version's wings are made out of steel swords controlled by electromagnets that can also be used as projectiles and initially works for the Kingpin until he is infected by a symbiote and attempts to take control of an invading symbiote army.
 The Marvel Noir incarnation of Adrian Toomes / Vulture appears as a boss in Spider-Man: Shattered Dimensions, voiced by Steve Blum. He obtains a fragment of the Tablet of Order and Chaos that grants him teleportation powers and is pursued by Spider-Man Noir, who seeks both the fragment and revenge for his Uncle Ben's murder.
 In the Nintendo DS version, the Marvel 2099 incarnation of Vulture appears as an enemy of Spider-Man 2099.
 The Adrian Toomes incarnation of Vulture appears as a boss in Marvel: Avengers Alliance. This version is a member of the Sinister Six.
 The Adrian Toomes incarnation of Vulture appears as a playable character in Lego Marvel Super Heroes, voiced by Nolan North.
 Various alternate reality versions of Adrian Toomes / Vulture appear as bosses in Spider-Man Unlimited, voiced by Christopher Daniel Barnes. They are members of a multiversal Sinister Six.
 The Adrian Toomes incarnation of Vulture appears in Marvel: Contest of Champions as a member of the Sinister Six.
 The Adrian Toomes incarnation of Vulture appears as a playable character in Marvel: Future Fight.
 The Adrian Toomes incarnation of Vulture appears as a playable character in Marvel Puzzle Quest as a member of the Sinister Six.
 The Adrian Toomes incarnation of Vulture appears as a playable character and boss in Lego Marvel Super Heroes 2. This version is a member of the Sinister Six.
 The Adrian Toomes incarnation of Vulture appears in Marvel Strike Force as a member of the Sinister Six.
 The Adrian Toomes incarnation of Vulture appears as a boss in Marvel's Spider-Man, voiced again by Dwight Schultz. This version is a long-time foe of Spider-Man's who suffers from spinal cancer as a result of prolonged exposure to his flight suit's power source. He joins Doctor Octopus' Sinister Six in the hopes of receiving a cure and partners with Electro to kill Spider-Man, only to be defeated and recaptured.

References

External links
 Spider-Man vs. The Vulture in 2 Minutes- Marvel TL;DR by Marvel Entertainment on YouTube
 Vulture I at Marvel.com
 Vulture II at Marvel.com
 
 
 
 

Action film villains
Villains in animated television series
Characters created by Gerry Conway
Characters created by John Romita Sr.
Characters created by Mark Waid
Characters created by Ross Andru
Characters created by Stan Lee
Characters created by Steve Ditko
Comics characters introduced in 1963
Comics characters introduced in 1967
Comics characters introduced in 2009
Fictional business executives
Fictional cannibals
Fictional characters from New York City
Fictional characters with absorption or parasitic abilities
Fictional characters with cancer
Fictional characters with slowed ageing
Fictional characters with superhuman durability or invulnerability
Fictional chemists
Fictional electronic engineers
Fictional inventors
Marvel Comics characters who can move at superhuman speeds
Marvel Comics characters with superhuman strength
Marvel Comics film characters
Marvel Comics male supervillains
Marvel Comics mutates
Marvel Comics scientists
Spider-Man characters
Spider-Man characters code names
Vigilante characters in comics